Blackwatertown is a small village in County Armagh, Northern Ireland. It sits on the River Blackwater, in the townland of Lisbofin, at the border with County Tyrone. Blackwatertown had a population of 376 in the 2011 Census. The River Blackwater enters Lough Neagh west of Derrywarragh Island and is navigable from Maghery to Blackwatertown.

History
In 1575, during the Tudor conquest of Ireland, the English built a fort at what is now Blackwatertown, to control this important river crossing in the heart of Gaelic Ulster. Most of the fort was on the eastern bank of the river, and there was a stone tower on the western bank. In February 1595, at the outset of the Nine Years' War, a Gaelic force led by Art MacBaron O'Neill assaulted and captured the fort from the English.

This fort is referenced in the village's Irish name, An Port Mór ("the great fort"). The wider townland is also called Lisbofin, from Lios Bó Finne meaning "fort of the white cow", which may refer to one of the ringforts in the area.

Blackwatertown was one of the first places in Northern Ireland to erect street signs in the Irish language in 1980. The village recently had signs erected at the entrances indicating its name; previously signs were erected by local individuals indicating its name in the Irish

Education 
Blackwatertown had three schools: Blackwatertown Boys' Primary School and Blackwatertown Girls' Primary School, both of which were managed by the Council for Catholic Maintained Schools; and Blackwatertown Primary School, managed by Blackwatertown Methodist Church and attended by pupils of several denominations. As the non-Roman Catholic population dwindled Blackwatertown Primary School ceased to be viable and closed. The other two schools amalgamated and formed a new school known as St Jarlath's Primary School.

Sport

The local GAA club, Port Mór, plays at Junior level in county competitions.

The local Boxing Club is St Jarlaths ABC.

The ancient sport of Road Bowling, known as Bullets, is still played along country roads. Two players throw a small metal ball (bullet) a set distance on a road; the winner is the player who finishes in the fewest throws. This sport is very popular in most parts of County Armagh and parts of Cork.

In popular culture
A fictional 1950s version of Blackwatertown is the setting for the crime thriller Blackwatertown by Paul Waters, published in 2020 by Unbound in paperback and ebook and by W.F. Howes now RBMedia in audiobook.

See also
List of towns and villages in Northern Ireland

References 

Villages in County Armagh
Villages in County Tyrone